Castlederg St Eugene's is a Gaelic Athletic Association club. The club is based in Castlederg in County Tyrone, Northern Ireland.

The club concentrates on Gaelic football, while Mná Na Deirge provides for ladies Gaelic football.

History

Formation of the club
The club was formed in 1975 under the name Naomh Eoghan Caislean na Deirge and has been in continuous existence ever since.

1975 - 2005
For the most part of the club's existence they have played their adult football at Junior level. However they were promoted to Intermediate football in 1980 and remained at that level until 1983. They were again successful at gaining promotion in 1989 and stayed in the Intermediate grade until 1993. In 2001 they won their first adult title when their Reserve team annexed the Junior Reserve Championship, beating Newtownstewart at Drumquin.

2006 - 2017
Unfortunately the club found life in Division 2 difficult, finishing second from bottom with only 8 League points after only 3 league wins and 2 draws.

2018 - present
In 2018 the club returned to junior football, but a string of poor results saw them finish 10th in the league and despite good victories over Killyman and Dregish in the Championship they were unable to progress any further, losing out to Newtownstewart in the quarter final stage to leave the senior team facing another year in Junior Football.

Achievements
In 2016, under the management of Dermot Corry, the club lifted their first ever league title at adult level when they lifted the Division 3 All County League.

 Tyrone Junior Football League (1) 
 2016

Notable players
John Lynch - Tyrone Senior Footballer (1980 - 1992) and 1986 All Star.

External links
Castlederg St Eugene's GAC Website

Gaelic games clubs in County Tyrone
Gaelic football clubs in County Tyrone